Adam Surat (The Inner Strength) is a 1989 Bangladeshi documentary film about the Bangladeshi painter Sheikh Mohammed Sultan, directed by Tareque Masud.

Synopsis 
Adam Surat is the first film of Masud. It is a documentary about Bangladeshi painter Sheikh Mohammed Sultan (well known as "SM Sultan"). Masud started the film in 1982 and completed after seven years later. By that time, he had met and married the Chicago-born Catherine Shapere (well known as Catherine Masud), with whom he formed a close working relationship until his death.

Digitized 
The 54 minute documentary film was taken in 16 mm film. The film had been converted into the digital format at a studio in New York City. The film would soon be released all over Bangladesh except Dhaka.

References

External links 

Bangladeshi documentary films
Bengali-language Bangladeshi films
Films directed by Tareque Masud
Films shot in Bangladesh
1989 directorial debut films